The Extraordinary and Plenipotentiary Ambassador of the Kingdom of Spain to Peru is the official representative of the Kingdom of Spain to the Republic of Peru.

Peru and Spain officially established relations on August 15, 1879, under Alfonso XII and have since maintained diplomatic relations with a brief exception during the years 1936 to 1939 as a result of the Spanish Civil War.

List of representatives

See also
List of ambassadors of Peru to Spain

References

Ambassadors of Spain to Peru
Peru
Spain